Lexatumumab (also known as ETR2-ST01) is an experimental agonistic human monoclonal antibody against TRAIL-R2 (DR5, APO-2), intended for the treatment of cancer.

HGS-ETR2 antibodies were generated by Human Genome Sciences through a collaboration with Cambridge Antibody Technology.

Development was discontinued in 2015.

References 

Monoclonal antibodies for tumors
Experimental cancer drugs